Persatuan Sepakbola Indonesia Wonogiri (simply known as Persiwi Wonogiri) is an Indonesian football club based in Wonogiri Regency, Central Java. They currently compete in the Liga 3.

References

External links

Football clubs in Indonesia
Football clubs in Central Java
Association football clubs established in 1970
1970 establishments in Indonesia